Darsah is an uninhabited island in the Guardafui Channel. It is part of the Socotra Archipelago of Yemen.  Darsah and neighboring Samhah ( to the west) are collectively known as "Al Akhawain" which means "The Brothers". There is a dispute between Yemen and Somalia's government over the island's sovereignty.

Important Bird Area
The island has been recognised as an Important Bird Area (IBA) by BirdLife International because it supports breeding colonies of red-billed tropicbirds and brown boobies.

References

Uninhabited islands of Yemen
Socotra archipelago
Islands of Somalia
Disputed islands
Territorial disputes of Yemen
Territorial disputes of Somalia
Important Bird Areas of Socotra
Seabird colonies